Reportedly haunted locations in Washington may refer to:

 Reportedly haunted locations in Washington (state)
 Reportedly haunted locations in Washington, D.C.